
Gmina Rokietnica is a rural gmina (administrative district) in Poznań County, Greater Poland Voivodeship, in west-central Poland.

Villages
Gmina Rokietnica contains the villages and settlements of Bytkowo, Cerekwica, Dalekie, Kiekrz, Kobylniki, Krzyszkowo, Mrowino, Napachanie, Pawłowice, Przybroda, Rogierówko, Rokietnica, Rostworowo, Sobota, Starzyny and Żydowo.

Neighbouring gminas
Gmina Rokietnica is bordered by the city of Poznań and by the gminas of Kaźmierz, Oborniki, Suchy Las, Szamotuły and Tarnowo Podgórne.

Sister cities
The following cities are twinned with Rokietnica:
  Viitasaari, Central Finland

References

Polish official population figures 2006

Rokietnica
Gmina Rokietnica